In enzymology, an acyl-CoA dehydrogenase (NADP+) is an enzyme that catalyzes the chemical reaction

acyl-CoA + NADP+  2,3-dehydroacyl-CoA + NADPH + H+

Thus, the two substrates of this enzyme are acyl-CoA and NADP+, whereas its 3 products are 2,3-dehydroacyl-CoA, NADPH, and H+.

This enzyme belongs to the family of oxidoreductases, specifically those acting on the CH-CH group of donor with NAD+ or NADP+ as acceptor.  The systematic name of this enzyme class is acyl-CoA:NADP+ 2-oxidoreductase. Other names in common use include 2-enoyl-CoA reductase, dehydrogenase, acyl coenzyme A (nicotinamide adenine dinucleotide, phosphate), enoyl coenzyme A reductase, crotonyl coenzyme A reductase, crotonyl-CoA reductase, and acyl-CoA dehydrogenase (NADP+).

Structural studies

As of late 2007, only one structure has been solved for this class of enzymes, with the PDB accession code .

References

 
 

EC 1.3.1
NADPH-dependent enzymes
Enzymes of known structure